"The Evolution of Trickster Stories Among the Dogs of North Park After the Change" is a 2007 science fiction/fantasy short story by American writer Kij Johnson. 

It was originally published in The Coyote Road: Trickster Tales, from Viking Press, and subsequently republished in The Year's Best Fantasy and Horror: 21st Annual Collection.

Synopsis
The story depicts a world in the aftermath of "the Change", a mysterious event whereby all domesticated mammals spontaneously gain near-human intelligence and the ability to speak. Terrified pet owners evict their dogs, and the bewildered animals cluster together in packs.

Linna, a student, interacts with the abandoned dogs as they become feral, and notices that they tell each other stories about "One Dog", a trickster figure.

Reception
It was shortlisted for the 2007 Nebula Award for Best Novelette. and the 2008 World Fantasy Award—Short Fiction.

References

External links
Text of the story on Kij Johnson's official site

Science fiction short stories
2007 short stories
Short stories by Kij Johnson